The New Zealand Women's Ice Hockey League (NZWIHL) is New Zealand's top-tier women's ice hockey league. Established in 2014 as New Zealand's first women's national league, the NZWIHL has amateur status and is sanctioned by the New Zealand Ice Hockey Federation (a member of the International Ice Hockey Federation). The NZWIHL is currently contested by four teams from both the North and South Islands. The league champion is awarded the Championship Trophy and gold medals and the league premier is awarded the Premiership Trophy. The most successful team in NZWIHL history is Auckland Steel, who have claimed four championship titles. The current champion, from 2022, is the Wakatipu Wild, who claimed their first title.

History 

The New Zealand Women's Ice Hockey League (NZWIHL) was established in 2014 as New Zealand's top level women's national league. The newly formed league was setup to support the National Women's team, the Ice Fernz, for their IIHF World Championship seasons. The league would provide opportunity for female players of all ages to develop their skills and play together in a competitive environment. The league was founded with three teams, including: Auckland Steel, Canterbury Devilettes and Southern Storm. The Auckland Steel topped the league standings in the first season to claim the first league premiership before they won the inaugural 2014 NZWIHL season grand final, to become the league's first championship team. The NZWIHL remained a three team league between 2014 and 2019, with Auckland establishing itself as a dominant force in the league, with four championship titles during this time. Canterbury were crowned champions in the second NZWIHL season and Southern Storm won the 2018 season. In 2020, a league decision saw the disbanding of the combined Southern Storm team and the establishment of two separate teams for the NZWIHL. The Dunedin Thunder and Wakatipu Wild were formed and based in Dunedin and Queenstown in the Otago region respectively. They joined the league and first competed in the 2020 NZWIHL season. Before the 2021 season, in July 2021, the Canterbury Devilettes changed their name to the Canterbury Inferno to create a separate identity from the Red Devils men's team. In August 2021, the league had to be cancelled midway through the season due to the New Zealand Government lock-downs to help minimise the COVID-19 pandemic. Originally the league still hoped to play finals at a later date, but that too got cancelled in November 2021. In 2022, Wakatipu Wild was the first of the two new teams to claim a league premiership and championship, when it went almost undefeated for the regular season and then won both games in finals.

Teams

Season structure and rules
As per 2022.

Regular season
The NZWIHL regular season is typically played over three months, with dates varying from season to season. The regular season consists of twelve games in total, with each team playing six games. The regular season is broken up into two rounds with a round-robin format used. An overtime period (OT) and shootout (SO) are used to ensure there is always a winner when time permits during the regular season. In the unlikely event of there being no time for OT or SO, then a draw will be declared.

Game length
The NZWIHL has adopted the international standard three 20-minute stop-time periods length for all regular season and finals games. All games progress to overtime and then a shootout in case teams are tied at the end of regulation time. In order to allow appropriate time for overtime to occur, rinks are booked to  hours as a minimum requirement in the NZWIHL.

Game rules and points system
All games and NZWIHL events are to be played in accordance to the rules set out in the NZWIHL events manual, followed by the International Ice Hockey Federation Rule Book. Governance for the events manual falls to the NZWIHL executive, headed by the General Manager (GM), and oversighted by the New Zealand Ice Hockey Federation (NZIHF) Management Committee. The NZWIHL points system, follows similar systems widely used in Europe and Australian ice hockey leagues. 3 points is awarded for a regulation time win, 2 points for a shootout win, 1 point for a shootout loss and 0 points for a regulation time loss. In the unlikely event of a draw, both teams will be awarded 1 point each.

Roster & import rules
There are no maximum roster limits in the NZWIHL. Players must be 13 years or older to play in the NZWIHL. NZWIHL players are broken up into two categories, regional players (New Zealand or Australian citizens) and import players (a citizen of any other country). Import players must have a cleared international transfer card (ITC) in order to be eligible to play an NZWIHL game. There are no limits on the number of import players allowed on a team's roster, however there is a limit on the number of import players teams are allowed to dress for a game. As of 2022, five import players from each team (10 total) are allowed to dress for any one game. Players from the Wellington region are provided additional travel supports by the league to play in the NZWIHL, given they do not have a representative team of their own in the league. The NZWIHL covers the traveling costs of traveling teams up to 15 skaters, two goaltenders and three staff (20 in total). Any additional traveling players or staff need to be financial covered by the teams themselves.

Playoffs
Playoffs are known in the NZWIHL as the Finals. They are played over a single weekend in a chosen location. The NZWIHL executive chooses the finals location. As of 2022, the Finals weekend involves four games in total, two semi-finals played on the Saturday followed by a third-place playoff and grand final on the Sunday. The top four teams from the regular season qualify for the finals weekend. The top seed plays the fourth seed in the first semi final followed by two verses three in the second semi. The two teams who win the semi-finals games progress to the grand final and the two teams who lose progress to the bronze medal game. The winner of the grand final is named NZWIHL champion and lifts the championship trophy. Gold, silver and bronze medals are given to rostered players and team officials on the teams who finish first, second and third in finals.

League champions

NZWIHL champions by seasons (2014-present)

References:

NZWIHL champions all-time record

Broadcasting

Current:
 YouTube (2020 – present) – The NZWIHL self broadcast league games live on YouTube on their official channel. Due to limited resources, not all games are broadcast.

References

External links

 Offical NZWIHL website
 Offical Facebook
 Elite Prospects league profile
New Zealand Ice Hockey Federation

 
Ice hockey leagues
Ice hockey leagues in New Zealand
1
Professional sports leagues in New Zealand